This list of museums in Wyoming encompasses museums defined for this context as institutions (including nonprofit organizations, government entities, and private businesses) that collect and care for objects of cultural, artistic, scientific, or historical interest and make their collections or related exhibits available for public viewing. Museums that exist only in cyberspace (i.e., virtual museums) are not included.

Museums

Defunct listings
 Old West Wax Museum, Thermopolis, closed in 2010, displays now at Wind River Heritage Center in Riverton
 Tecumsah's Old West Miniature Village & Museum, Cody
 Wyoming Children's Museum and Nature Center, Laramie, closed in 2010

References

External links
 Wyoming Museums - list at Wyoming State Museum
 Wyoming Historical Society - List of Museums in Wyoming
 Historical Museum Guide for Wyoming
 Colorado-Wyoming Association of Museums

Wyoming
Museums
Museums